Yelena Kalugina (born 22 May 1972) is a Belarusian cross-country skier. She competed in three events at the 2002 Winter Olympics.

References

External links
 

1972 births
Living people
People from Kirov Oblast
Belarusian female cross-country skiers
Olympic cross-country skiers of Belarus
Cross-country skiers at the 2002 Winter Olympics